Guyon Guérin de Bouscal (1613–1657) was a French dramatist and novelist.

Selected works
Oroondate (performed 1643), a parody of the widespread literary models of heroic courtship
a trilogy based on Don Quixote (performed 1638-9), notable for its accomplished use of the burlesque and thought to have been adapted and played by Molière's company as Le Gouvernement de Sancho Pansa in 1660.
La mort de Brute et de Porcie (1637), on the deaths of Brutus and his wife Portia
One novel

External links
 
 
 http://www.answers.com/topic/maurice-de-gu-rin-2

1613 births
1657 deaths
17th-century French dramatists and playwrights
17th-century French novelists
17th-century French male writers